There are at least 56 named trails in Lincoln County, Montana according to the U.S. Geological Survey, Board of Geographic Names.  A trail is defined as: "Route for passage from one point to another; does not include roads or highways (jeep trail, path, ski trail)."

 Allen Peak Trail, el.  
 Back Side of the Moon Ski Trail, el.  
 Bear Lakes Trail, el.  
 Big Red Ski Trail, el.  
 Blacktail Trail, el.  
 Boulevard Ski Trail, el.  
 Boundary Run Ski Trail, el.  
 Calx Mountain Trail, el.  
 Chans Run Ski Trail, el.  
 Cornices Ski Trail, el.  
 Coyote Creek Trail, el.  
 Crowell Trail, el.  
 Divide Cutoff Trail, el.  
 Divide Trail, el.  
 Divide Trail, el.  
 Elk Basin Ski Trail, el.  
 Elk Mountain National Recreation Trail, el.  
 Far North Ski Trail, el.  
 Fisher Mountain Trail, el.  
 Goat Mountain Trail, el.  
 Grouse Lake Trail, el.  
 Himes Creek Trail, el.  
 Holes Hell Ski Trail, el.  
 Horse Mountain Trail, el.  
 Iron Meadow Trail, el.  
 Jeep Road Plus Ski Trail, el.  
 Lake Creek Trail, el.  
 Lake Creek Trail, el.  
 Libby Divide Trail, el.  
 Lower Mambo Ski Trail, el.  
 Main Ski Trail, el.  
 Meadow Ridge Trail, el.  
 Mixing Bowl Ski Trail, el.  
 Mount Marston National Recreation Trail, el.  
 Near South Ski Trail, el.  
 Newton Gulch Trail, el.  
 NoGo Ski Trail, el.  
 North Ski Trail, el.  
 Pig Chute Number One Ski Trail, el.  
 Pig Chute Number Two Ski Trail, el.  
 Pine Creek Trail, el.  
 Pneumonia Ridge Ski Trail, el.  
 Powder Mills Ski Trail, el.  
 Power Dive Ski Trail, el.  
 Pulpit Mountain National Recreation Trail, el.  
 Ross Creek Pack Trail, el.  
 RunOut Ski Trail, el.  
 Seventh Heaven Ski Trail, el.  
 Silver Butte Trail, el.  
 Sipes Creek Trail, el.  
 Slimmer Creek Trail, el.  
 South Fork Ross Creek Trail, el.  
 Sun Dance Bowl Ski Trail, el.  
 Teeters Peak Trail, el.  
 Tepee Mountain Trail, el.  
 Upper Mambo Ski Trail, el.

Further reading

See also
 List of trails of Montana
 Trails of Yellowstone National Park

Notes

Geography of Lincoln County, Montana
 Lincoln County
Transportation in Lincoln County, Montana